Ola Girls' Secondary School is first female second cycle institution in Kenyase No. 2 to be established in the Ahafo Region of Ghana.

History
Ola Girls' Secondary School was established in 1973 by the Catholic Sisters, Our Lady of Apostles in collaboration with the late Rev James Kwadwo Owusu, and the then Omanhene of the Kenyasi No.2 Traditional Area, Nana Nsiah Ababio. However it officially started on the September 27, 1974 with 34 girls. It was until September, 1976 that it was absorbed into the public school system.

References

External links
 

Girls' schools in Ghana
High schools in Ghana
Boarding schools in Ghana
Ahafo Region
Educational institutions established in 1973
1973 establishments in Ghana